Evans Quao (born 11 May 1990) is a Ghanaian footballer who most recently played as a defender for Asante Kotoko in the First Capital Plus Premier League.

Career

Mumbai
Quao played for Mumbai F.C. in the I-League during the 2009-10 and 2010-11 season but however left the club at the end of the season. Then on 12 July 2012 it was officially confirmed that Quao had re-signed with Mumbai F.C. for the 2012-13 I-League season. During his first spell at the club Quao scored two goals. His first goal occurred on 1 May 2010 against Viva Kerala in which he helped Mumbai win 1–0. He then scored his second goal for the club on 13 February 2011 against Air India FC as Mumbai won 1–0.

Career statistics

Club
Statistics accurate as of 1 February 2013

References

Ghanaian footballers
1990 births
Living people
I-League players
Expatriate footballers in India
Ghanaian expatriate sportspeople in India
Mumbai FC players
Association football midfielders